École secondaire Gaétan-Gervais, previously known as École secondaire Oakville, is a French language high school in Oakville, Ontario, Canada.It was the town's first French language high school. This school is one of 47 schools in the Conseil Scolaire Viamonde school board.

History
École secondaire Gaétan-Gervais opened its door to 75 students on 6 September 2011 under the temporary name of École secondaire Oakville. It was on 24 February 2012, during the official celebration of the school's 1 year anniversary, that the winning name of the school naming student vote was announced : École secondaire Gaétan-Gervais. The school was named after one of the men who created the Franco-Ontarian flag, Gaétan Gervais.

The school is temporarily sharing a building with École élémentaire du Chêne. The secondary school students have requested more suitable amenities and a new building numerous times since its establishment. On 30 October 2015, M.P.P. Kevin Flynn, announced the construction of a new building at McCraney street East. The new building will be open for the 2017–2018 school year.

Feeder schools
 École élémentaire du Chêne, which shares a building with  École secondaire Gaétan-Gervais
 École élémentaire Patricia-Picknell in Oakville (1257 Sedgewick crescent)
 École élémentaire Horizon Jeunesse in Mississauga (1445 Lewisham drive)

School zone
The school welcomes students from Oakville and Mississauga

Extracurricular activities
The following École secondaire Gaétan-Gervais sports teams are a part of the Halton Secondary School Athletic Association (HSSAA):
 Guys and Girls Senior and Junior soccer teams
 Guys and Girls Senior and Junior basketball teams
 Guys and Girls Senior and Junior volleyball teams
 Guys and Girls Senior and Junior hockey teams

Since 2013, the students have had the opportunity to participate in La Grande Traversée (LGT), a cycling relay from Montreal, Quebec to Vancouver, B.C.
	
École secondaire Gaétan-Gervais also has many clubs:
 Improv Club
 DJ Club
 Gay-Straight Alliance
 The Eco-Griffons 
 Yearbook Club
 Mathematics Club
 Chess Club
 Humanitarian Club

Available programs
Since September 2014,École secondaire Gaétan-Gervais offered the Baccalauréat International diploma to its 11th and 12th grade students.

The school also offers the Specialist High Skills Major (SHMS) program in sports to its 11th and 12th grade students. The goal of this program is to teach students indispensable skills needed to succeed in the world of sports, sport management and sports medicine thanks to workshops, certifications, and local sports competitions.

School trips
In 2013, eleven 9th and 10th grade students had the chance to participate in an international trip to Europe  as part of their history class. They visited the Netherlands, Belgium, France, and Germany. They got to see many historical European cities: Amsterdam, Berlin, Ypres, Paris, Normandy, Dieppe, Vimy, etc.

In May, 2015, the students of the 8th grade went to Camp Muskoka in Ontario to develop their leadership skills. They participated in many activities including soccer, hiking, and a camp fire.

Technology
École secondaire Gaétan-Gervais has many technologies to assist students :
 Laptops
 Computer Lab
 electronic tablets (Apple iPad, Microsoft Surface)
 Interactive white boards (SMART boards)

Provincial test results
Four cohorts (2012, 2013, 2014, 2015) have passed  the Ontario Secondary School Literacy Test (OSSLT) with a 100% passing rate.

References

French-language high schools in Ontario
High schools in the Regional Municipality of Halton